Cushing Strout was an American intellectual historian. He was Ernest I. White Professor of American Studies and Humane Letters at Cornell University.

Works
The Pragmatic Revolt in American History: Carl Becker and Charles Beard (1959)
The American Image of the Old World (1963)
Hawthorne in England: Selections from "Our Old Home" and "The English Note-Books" (1965)
Conscience, Science & Security: The Case Of Dr. J. Robert Oppenheimer (1965) editor
Spirit of American Government by J. Allen Smith (1965) editor
Intellectual History in America (1968) editor, two volumes, Contemporary Essays on Puritanism, the Enlightenment & Romanticism, and From Darwin to Niebuhr
Divided We Stand: Reflections on the Crisis at Cornell (1970) editor with  David I. Grossvogel
The New Heavens and New Earth: Political Religion in America (1973)
The Veracious Imagination: Essays on American History, Literature and Biography (1981)
Making American Tradition: Visions & Revisions from Ben Franklin to Alice Walker (1990)

References

External links
 Cushing Strout correspondence at Williams College Archives & Special Collections

21st-century American historians
21st-century American male writers
Cornell University faculty
Living people
Year of birth missing (living people)
American male non-fiction writers